"Darlin'" is a song written in 1970 by English sax player Oscar Stewart Blandamer. It was first released under the title "Darling" by the British country band Poacher in 1978. It was later a chart hit for Frankie Miller and David Rogers. The track was subsequently recorded by numerous artists including Tom Jones, Barbara Mandrell, Smokie and Johnny Reid.

Background
British country band Poacher formed in Warrington, England, in 1977. They competed in the sixth series of New Faces, a British television talent show. "Darling" was released as their debut single in 1978, produced by Barry Kingston and released through his label RK Records in the United Kingdom. Songwriter Oscar Stewart Blandamer wrote the track in 1970. Producer David Mackay picked up the song for Scottish singer-songwriter Frankie Miller, who recorded it for his album Falling in Love (1979).

Frankie Miller version

Miller recorded the song in 1978 and had an international hit with it. It reached number 1 on the Norwegian Singles Chart, and 6 in the UK Singles Chart. It also reached the Top Ten (#8) in Australia in 1979.

Charts

Weekly charts

Year-end charts

David Rogers version

A country music version was recorded by the American singer David Rogers. Released on the Republic label, it was never included on an album.

Rogers' recording was a relatively minor hit reaching #18 on the Billboard country singles charts.

Charts

Other cover versions

Tom Jones

Johnny Reid

Other artists
Barbara Mandrell released a cover version in 1979, which served as the B-side to her number one single "Years."

In 1980 the song was one of two by Bonnie Raitt included on the soundtrack of the film, Urban Cowboy. It was not released as a single, although her other contribution, Don't It Make Ya Wanna Dance was issued to Country radio. It failed to crack the Top 40 on the chart, peaking at #42.

In 1981 Welsh pop singer Tom Jones released the song as a single from his Mercury Records album Darlin'. Jones' rendition also reached the country music Top 20, peaking at #19 there in addition to reaching number 3 on the Bubbling Under Hot 100.

The British band Smokie recorded a cover version in their 2000 covers album Uncovered.

In 2004 singer Bonnie Tyler released a version of the song on her album Simply Believe.

In 2007 Canadian singer Johnny Reid also released a version of the song on the album Kicking Stones. His version peaked at number 57 on the Canadian Hot 100.

References

 

1978 singles
1979 singles
1981 singles
2007 singles
Tom Jones (singer) songs
Johnny Reid songs
David Rogers (singer) songs
Open Road Recordings singles
1970 songs